Crista  may refer to:
 Crista Arangala, American mathematician
 Crista Cullen (born 1985), an English field hockey player
 Crista Dahl (born 1934), Canadian artist
 Crista Flanagan (born 1976), an American television and stand-up comedian
 Crista Moore (born 1968), American actress
 Crista Nicole (born 1978), an American model and actress
 Crista Samaras, American inventor

Feminine given names